The Ottawa River Waterway is a series of portage bypass sites around rapids and dams along the Ottawa River, managed by the Governments of Ontario and Quebec, to allow recreational boating between Lake Timiskaming and Montreal.  The Waterway officially starts in Mattawa, Ontario, but provides access all the way down to Pembroke and Ottawa.

Bypass sites

The bypass sites provide hydraulic lifters and trucks for transporting boats along key portages. They are located at the following points:

 Fitzroy Harbour, Ontario
 Portage-du-Fort, Quebec and Bryson, Quebec
 Chapeau, Quebec and Desjardinsville, Quebec
 Rapides-des-Joachims, Quebec
 Mattawa, Ontario
 Témiscaming, Quebec

See also 
 Ottawa River
 Ottawa Valley
 Ottawa-Bonnechere Graben
 Rideau Canal
 Welland Canal
 Trent–Severn Waterway

Geographic topics 
 Opeongo Hills to the west
 Laurentian Highlands to the north and east
 Laurentian Mountains to the north and east
 Parks Canada
 Parks Ontario
 Rouge Park
 St. Lawrence Parks Commission
 St. Lawrence Waterway
 Niagara Parks Commission
 National Capital Commission
 St. Clair Parks Commission
 Conservation authority
 Conservation Ontario
 Société des établissements de plein air du Québec (SEPAQ) (SEPAQ)

External links 
 Ottawa River Waterway

Parks in Ontario
Parks in Quebec
Water transport in Ontario
Water transport in Quebec